The Roman Catholic Diocese of Loja is a diocese located in the city of Loja in the Ecclesiastical province of Cuenca in Ecuador. It was erected on 29 December 1862 from territory of the Diocese of Cuenca.

Ordinaries
José María Massia, O.F.M. (17 Sep 1875 – 1902)
Juan José Antonio Eguiguren-Escudero (6 Mar 1907 – 15 Jan 1911)
Carlos María Javier de la Torre (30 Dec 1911 – 21 Aug 1919), appointed Bishop of Bolivar; future Cardinal
Guillermo José Harris Morales (7 May 1920 – 1944)
Nicanor Roberto Aguirre Baus (23 Oct 1945 – 10 Oct 1956)
Juán Maria Riofrio, O.P. (10 Oct 1956 – 24 Jun 1963)
Luis Alfonso Crespo Chiriboga (2 Nov 1963 – 21 Sep 1972)
Alberto Zambrano Palacios, O.P. (11 Dec 1972 – 2 May 1985)
Hugolino Cerasuolo Stacey, O.F.M. (2 May 1985 – 15 Jun 2007)
Julio Parrilla Díaz (18 Apr 2008 – 12 January 2013)
Alfredo José Espinoza Mateus, S.D.B. (20 December 2013 – 5 April 2019), appointed Archbishop of Quito
Walter Jehová Heras Segarra, O.F.M. (31 Oct 2019 - )

Special churches
National Shrine: Santuario Nacional de Nuestra Señora del Cisne in El Cisne

External links
 GCatholic.org
 Catholic Hierarchy

Roman Catholic dioceses in Ecuador
Roman Catholic Ecclesiastical Province of Cuenca
Religious organizations established in 1862
Roman Catholic dioceses and prelatures established in the 19th century
1862 establishments in Ecuador